Dagmar Lerchová, married surname: Řeháková (22 October 1930 – 24 April 2017) was a competitive figure skater who represented Czechoslovakia. She placed 13th at the 1948 Winter Olympics in St. Moritz, eighth at the 1949 World Championships in Paris, and fifth at two European Championships (1949 Milan, 1950 Oslo). 

Raised in Holešovice, Lerchová skated at a nearby ice rink and on the frozen Vltava river. On 10 December 1958, she gave birth to her daughter, Liliana Řeháková, who would place fourth in ice dancing at the 1980 Winter Olympics.

Competitive highlights

References 

Czechoslovak female single skaters
Czech female single skaters
Olympic figure skaters of Czechoslovakia
Figure skaters at the 1948 Winter Olympics
Figure skaters from Prague
1930 births
2017 deaths